Juliusz Janotha (b. 1819 – d. 26 June 1883 in Warsaw), was a Polish pianist, composer and teacher of German origin. He was married to Anthony Oleschinsky's daughter Anne Oleschinska, with whom he had a daughter, the pianist and composer Natalia Janotha.

Supported by Apollinary Katski, he collected funds for the construction of the Music Institute in Warsaw. After the inauguration in 1861, he took over his piano teaching. He retired in 1879, being so succeeded by Paul de Schlözer. His students include Ignacy Jan Paderewski and Józef Śliwiński. In his last years of life, as reported in the obituary newspaper Echo Muzyczne i Teatralne, at the urging of her daughter, he took over composition and published a number of piano pieces.

He died on 26 June 1883, buried in the Powązki Cemetery.

Works
Deux Mazurkas (1:B-flat minor, 2:D-flat major) Op.1, dedicated to Tytus Chałubiński
Valse élégante Op.2
Gavotte (E major)
Pieśń bez słów (Songs Without Words) (E-flat major)

Notes

References

External links
 Scores by Juliusz Janotha in digital library Polona

Polish music educators
Polish composers
Composers for piano
Polish classical pianists
Male classical pianists
Burials at Powązki Cemetery
1819 births
1883 deaths
19th-century composers
19th-century classical pianists
19th-century male musicians